Sara Rue (born January 26, 1979) is an American actress. She is known for her performances as Carmen Ferrara on Popular, as Claude Casey on Less than Perfect, and as the Attorney General in Idiocracy. In 2011, she hosted The CW reality series Shedding for the Wedding. She had a recurring role in the comedy Rules of Engagement, in which she played Brenda, the softball teammate and good friend of Jeff Bingham. She also had a regular role as Kim on the short-lived ABC sitcom Malibu Country, and appeared in the main cast of the TV Land comedy series Impastor. She is also known for her role as Olivia Caliban in the second season of A Series of Unfortunate Events.

Early life
Sara Rue was born Sara Schlackman in New York City, the daughter of Joan Schlackman (née Rue), a municipal employee and former actress, and Marc Schlackman, a stage manager. The elder of two daughters, she was raised in New York, where her parents were active in Broadway theatre. She is Jewish.

Career
Rue began her acting career at the age of nine, appearing in the 1988 film Rocket Gibraltar as Kevin Spacey's daughter. Rue played a very young Roseanne in the first meeting of Roseanne and Dan at a dance on the TV show Roseanne.

She starred in the comedy Grand, before going on to work on Phenom; Minor Adjustments; Zoe, Duncan, Jack & Jane; ER; The Division and Popular. From 2002 to 2006, she starred in the main role of Claude Casey on the ABC sitcom Less than Perfect. She has appeared in several films, including A Map of the World, Can't Hardly Wait, A Slipping Down Life, Idiocracy, Gypsy 83. She also had a small part as a babysitter in Gore Verbinski's adaptation of The Ring. She impressed director Michael Bay so much that a role was written into the movie Pearl Harbor for her.

Rue appeared uncredited in the 2006 Mike Judge film Idiocracy, in the role of the Attorney General. In 2006, Rue starred in the stage musical Little Egypt with French Stewart, Jenny O'Hara and Gregg Henry at the Matrix Theatre in Los Angeles. She guest-starred in Two and a Half Men as Berta's pregnant youngest daughter. She had a stint on the CBS sitcom The Big Bang Theory, playing Leonard Hofstadter's physician girlfriend Dr Stephanie Barnett for three episodes. Her first appearance on the show occurred on November 17, 2008. In 2009, Rue appeared in the movies Man Maid and For Christ's Sake. She starred on the short-lived 2009 series Eastwick, based on the novel and movie The Witches of Eastwick.

In October 2010, Rue joined the cast of Rules of Engagement in a recurring role as Brenda, Jeff and Audrey's surrogate.

It was announced in December, 2011 that Rue would be writing and starring in a new show on The CW called Poseurs, about a young woman named Lucy whose life is upended when her fiancé moves out and her fresh-from-rehab collegiate best friend, Alexandra, moves in. The two friends pose as a lesbian couple and actually get married in order to stay in the nice apartment building that only allows married couples.

Rue starred in the ABC show Malibu Country as Reba McEntire's upbeat trophy wife neighbor, Kim Sallinger. Malibu Country ran for one season (2012–13). Rue had the title role of Deb Dorfman in the movie Dorfman in Love (2012).

In 2014, Rue appeared in a recurring role as Candace, fiancee of Christy's ex-husband on the CBS sitcom Mom. In 2015, she was cast as main character Dora in the TV Land comedy Impastor. The show was cancelled after its second season in 2016.  Rue has a recurring role as Nancy Granville on ABC's American Housewife.

In 2017, Rue was cast in the recurring role of Olivia Caliban on the second season of the Netflix comedy drama series A Series of Unfortunate Events.

Personal life
Rue married filmmaker Mischa Livingstone in 2001, and they divorced in 2007. Rue married teacher Kevin Price on May 21, 2011, in a traditional Jewish wedding. She gave birth to their first child, a daughter, in February 2013. She and Price adopted a second daughter in November 2016.

Filmography

Film

Television

References

Notes

External Links
 

1979 births
Actresses from New York City
American child actresses
American film actresses
American television actresses
Jewish American actresses
Living people
20th-century American actresses
21st-century American actresses
21st-century American Jews